A horse race is a speed competition involving horses.

Horse race or horse racing may also refer to:

Horse race (politics)
Horse race journalism
Horse Racing (video game), a 1980 video game
Horserace (drinking game)

See also

Race Horse (clipper)